Sarala Devi (9 August 1904 – 4 October 1986) was an Indian independence activist, feminist, social activist, politician and writer. She was the first Odia woman to join the Non-cooperation movement in 1921 and the first Odia woman delegate of the Indian National Congress. She became the first woman to be elected to the Odisha Legislative Assembly on 1 April 1936.

She was also the first female Speaker of the Odisha Legislative Assembly, the first woman Director of Cuttack Co-operative Bank, and the first female Senate member of Utkal University. She was the only representative from Odisha on President Dr S. Radhakrishnan's Education Commission.

Early life

Sarala Devi was born on 9 August 1904 in Narilo village, near Balikuda, in what was then the Orissa Division of the Bengal Presidency (now in Jagatsinghpur district, Odisha) to a very wealthy, aristocratic Zamindar family. Her father was Dewan Basudev Kanungo, and her mother was Padmavati Devi. She was adopted and raised by her father's elder brother, Balamukunda Kanungo, a Deputy Collector.

Sarala received her primary education in Banki, where her uncle was posted. Women had no access to higher education, at the time, so her uncle hired the services of a home tutor. Sarala learned Bengali, Sanskrit, Odia and basic English from her tutor. She lived with her uncle until the age of 13.

Public life
While in Banki, Sarala was inspired by stories of Suka Devi, the queen of Banki, to join the independence movement. She donated  a sizeable part of her large collection of jewellery and vast tracts of real estate to the fight for India's independence. She married well-known lawyer Bhagirathi Mohapatra in 1917, and the latter joined the Indian National Congress in 1918. Sarala herself joined the Congress in 1921, following Mahatma Gandhi's first visit to Orissa. She was the first woman Member of the Odisha Legislative Assembly as well as its first woman Speaker.

She was very close to Mahatma Gandhi, Jawaharlal Nehru, Durgabai Deshmukh, Acharya Kripalani, Kamaladevi Chattopadhyay and Sarojini Naidu.
She was the Secretary of Utkal Sahitya Samaj at Cuttack from 1943 to 1946.

Literary works
Sarala wrote 30 books and 300 essays.

 Bishwa Biplabani, 1930
 Utkalaa Nari Samasya, 1934
 Narira Dabi, 1934
 Bharatiya Mahila Prasanga, 1935 
 Rabindra Puja, 1935
 Beera Ramani, 1949  
 
  Translated from Oriya.

References

Further reading
 Sarala Devi's eye-witness account of Mahatma Gandhi in Orissa

1904 births
1986 deaths
Odisha MLAs 1937–1945
Indian National Congress politicians from Odisha
Women in Odisha politics
Women writers from Odisha
Activists from Odisha
Indian independence activists
Indian feminists
20th-century Indian women writers
20th-century Indian women politicians
20th-century Indian politicians
20th-century Indian non-fiction writers